Garin Jenkins (born 18 August 1966 in Ynysybwl) is a former Wales international rugby union player. He was the most capped Welsh hooker having attained 58 caps until surpassed by Matthew Rees on 14 June 2014.

Jenkins played in the Rugby Union World Cup three times: 1991, 1995 and 1999 and at the time played for Swansea RFC, a club he captained.

Jenkins lives in Ynysybwl with his wife and children.

References

External links

1966 births
Living people
Rugby union hookers
Rugby union players from Ynysybwl
Swansea RFC players
Wales international rugby union players
Welsh rugby union players